The women's 4 × 200 metre freestyle relay competition at the 2022 Mediterranean Games was held on 3 July 2022 at the Aquatic Center of the Olympic Complex in Bir El Djir.

Records
Prior to this competition, the existing world and Mediterranean Games records were as follows:

Results 
The final was held at 19:28.

References

Women's 4 x 200 metre freestyle relay
2022 in women's swimming